Samuel Hazeldine (born 29 March 1972) is an English actor working in film, television and theatre. In film he has appeared in Bridget Jones: The Edge of Reason (2004), Weekender (2010), The Raven (2012), Grimsby (2016), and The Last Duel (2021). On television, he has had roles in Prime Suspect 6 (2003), Persuasion (2007), The Kevin Bishop Show (2008-2009), Peaky Blinders and Resurrection (2014), The Innocents (2018), The Witcher (2021), and The Sandman (2022).

Early life
Sam Hazeldine was born in Hammersmith, London. He is the son of actors James Hazeldine and Rebecca Moore. He studied at the Royal Academy of Dramatic Art for two years, receiving an Acting (RADA Diploma) in 1994. However, before completing the course, he left acting to pursue a career in music with the band 'Mover.

Career
Hazeldine returned to acting ten years later in 2003, when he made his professional debut as D.C. David Butcher in Prime Suspect 6. In 2007, he played Charles Musgrove in the British television film Persuasion, together with Sally Hawkins and Rupert Penry-Jones. 

From 2008-2009, he was a main cast member of the sketch comedy The Kevin Bishop Show playing various characters. The show 
The show was nominated for Best New Comedy at the 2008, and Best Sketch Show at the British Comedy Awards. 

In 2014, he had a recurring role as George Sewell in the British period crime drama television series Peaky Blinders, alongside Cillian Murphy and Sam Neill.
Between 2014-2015, he starred as Caleb Richards in 13 episodes the American fantasy drama television series Resurrection. 

In 2018, Hazeldine took on a main role playing John McDaniel in the British supernatural television series The Innocents, alongside Guy Pearce. Despite the series scoring an 86% Average critics score on the Rotten Tomatoes Tomatometer, no further series followed.

In 2019, he was cast in The War Below, which released in 2021. That same year he appeared in Ridley Scott's The Last Duel, in a cast which included Jodie Comer, Matt Damon, Ben Affleck, and Adam Driver. 

in 2021, Hazeldine played the role of Eredin, the leader of the Red Riders, in season 2 of the Netflix fantasy drama television series The Witcher.

In 2024, Hazeldine is due to replace Joseph Mawle in the role of Adar for season two of The Lord of the Rings: The Rings of Power.

Filmography

Film

Television

Theatre

References

External links
 

Living people
1972 births
21st-century English male actors
Alumni of RADA
English male film actors
English male Shakespearean actors
English male stage actors
English male television actors
English male voice actors
Male actors from London
People educated at Denstone College
People from Hammersmith
People from Tottenham